The 2001 FIRA Women's European Championship featured 12 countries and was the first divided into two pools - A and B, with the strongest eight sides in the former. The tournament was also for the first time spread around several grounds in a region, rather than being played at one location. The A Pool was won by Scotland, and the B pool by Sweden. Both France and England were represented by their second string "A" teams.

Pool A

Bracket

First round

Plate semi-finals

Semi-finals

7th/8th

Plate final

3rd/4th place

Final

Pool B

Final table

Results

See also
Women's international rugby union

External links
FIRA website

2000
2001 rugby union tournaments for national teams
International women's rugby union competitions hosted by France
2001–02 in European women's rugby union
2000–01 in French rugby union
2000–01 in Italian rugby union
2000–01 in English rugby union
2000–01 in Welsh rugby union
2000–01 in Scottish rugby union
2000–01 in Irish rugby union
2001 in Dutch women's sport
2001 in Kazakhstani sport
rugby union
2001 in Belgian women's sport
rugby union
rugby union
rugby union
rugby union
rugby union
rugby union
May 2001 sports events in France